Al-Sultan Wadi Kalaminjaa Siri Dhagatha Suvara Mahaa Radun (Dhivehi: އައްސުލޠާން ވަޑީ ކަލަމިންޖާ ސިރީ ދަގަތާ ސުވަރަ މަހާ ރަދުން) was the Sultan of the Maldives between 1214 and 1233. He was also one of the sons of Fathahiriyaa Maavaa Kilege (Dhivehi: ފަތަހިރިޔާ މާވާކިލެގެ). Sultan Wadi ascended the throne in 1214 after the death of his elder brother Sultan Dhihei. He was succeeded by his younger brother Valla Dio

13th-century sultans of the Maldives
1233 deaths
Year of birth unknown